Death to Tyrants is the eighth album by American hardcore punk band Sick of It All, released on April 18, 2006. On this record, the band introduced a much heavier and stronger sound. This was the first Sick of It All album not released on Fat Wreck Chords (who released their previous three albums) since 1997's Built to Last.

Track listing
All the tracks were written by Sick of It All.
 "Take the Night Off" – 2:42
 "Machete" – 2:05
 "Preamble" – 0:27
 "Uprising Nation" – 2:23
 "Always War" – 2:03
 "Die Alone" – 2:34
 "Evil Schemer" – 2:42
 "Leader" – 1:12
 "Make a Mark" – 3:08
 "Forked Tongue" – 1:30
 "The Reason" – 2:05
 "Faithless" – 2:51
 "Fred Army" – 2:43
 "Thin Skin" – 2:13
 "Maria White Trash" – 2:50
 "Don't Join the Crowd" (European edition bonus track) – 2:56

"Persistence Tour 2006 edition" track listing
 "Take the Night Off" – 2:42
 "Machete" – 2:05
 "Preamble" – 0:27
 "Uprising Nation" – 2:23
 "Always War" – 2:03
 "Die Alone" – 2:34
 "Evil Schemer" – 2:42
 "Leader" – 1:12
 "Make a Mark" – 3:08
 "Forked Tongue" – 1:30
 "The Reason" – 2:05
 "Faithless" – 2:51
 "Fred Army" – 2:43
 "Thin Skin" – 2:13
 "Maria White Trash" – 2:50
 "Don't Join the Crowd" – 2:56
 Walls of Jericho - "Us Vs. Them" (cover) – 3:14
 Madball - "Give Respect" (cover) – 1:16
 "Take the Night Off" (recorded live in Essen, Germany 2006)
 "Machete" (recorded live in Essen, Germany 2006)
 "Take the Night Off" music video

Extra information
 "The Reason" was originally called "Sodom"

Credits
Lou Koller – vocals
Pete Koller – guitar
Craig Setari – bass guitar
Armand Majidi – drums
Freddy Cricien of Madball – guest vocals on "Forked Tongue"
Recorded at Atomic Recording Studio, Brooklyn, New York
Pre-production at Underground Sound Studios, South Amboy, New Jersey
Produced by Tue Madsen and Armand Majidi
Layout and design by Empty Design Coalition
Dave Quiggle – artwork

References

External links
Abacus Recordings information

2006 albums
Sick of It All albums
Century Media Records albums
Albums produced by Tue Madsen